Flatwoods is an unincorporated community in northwestern Jackson County, West Virginia, United States.  It lies at the intersection of Crooked Run and Harpold Roads, northwest of the city of Ripley, the county seat of Jackson County.  Its elevation is 755 feet (230 m).

References

Unincorporated communities in Jackson County, West Virginia
Unincorporated communities in West Virginia